Sheikh Khabir Uddin Ahmed, a politician from Communist Party of India (Marxist), is a Member of the Parliament of India representing West Bengal in the Rajya Sabha, the upper house of the Parliament.

External links
 Profile on Rajya Sabha website

References

Communist Party of India (Marxist) politicians from West Bengal
Rajya Sabha members from West Bengal
Living people
Year of birth missing (living people)